Plumas Lake Elementary School District is a public school district in Yuba County, California, United States.

In 2003 Marysville Joint Unified School District gave territory to Plumas Lake Elementary School District and Wheatland Union High School District.

References

External links
 

School districts in California